Teodor Bogdan Lubieniecki (c. 1654, Czarkowy – 1718, Nowy Korczyn) was a Polish Baroque painter and engraver.

Biography
Teodor and his brother Krzysztof Lubieniecki hailed from an Arian family. They learned to paint from Juriaan Stur in Hamburg. In 1667 they travelled to Amsterdam, where Krzysztof became an apprentice of Adriaen Backer, and Teodor of Gerard de Lairesse. Teodor enjoyed success in Amsterdam and was visited and admired by Cosimo III de' Medici, Grand Duke of Tuscany, who was visiting Amsterdam while on his Grand Tour up the Rhine. In 1682, Teodor moved to Hanover where he found works for the art-loving Frederick William I, Elector of Brandenburg. He was the court painter of the next elector, later King Frederick I of Prussia, who made Lubieniecki the first curator of his Akademie der Künste in 1702.  In 1706 Lubieniecki moved to Poland, which is where he later died.

References

External links
 Artnet.com, Teodor (Bogdan) Lubieniecki

1654 births
1718 deaths
17th-century engravers
18th-century engravers
Polish engravers
17th-century Polish painters
Polish male painters
18th-century Polish–Lithuanian painters
18th-century male artists